Elizabeth Bevarly (born 1961 in Louisville, Kentucky, United States) is an American writer of over 70 romance novels since 1989. She is a New York Times bestselling author.

Biography
Bevarly was born in 1961 and raised in Louisville, Kentucky. Her grandmothers were Ruth Bevarly and Hazel Robinson.

In 1983, she obtained a B.A. with honors in English from the University of Louisville. She worked many diverse jobs, including an editorial assistant for a medical journal. In 1989, she published her first novel. Now, she is a New York Times bestselling, award-winning author.

She married a member of the Coast Guard who was stationed in San Juan, Puerto Rico. She has also lived in Washington D.C., Northern Virginia, and South Jersey. In 1994, they had a son, and now they, their son and their two cats reside back in her native Kentucky.

Awards
 Career Achievement Award, Romantic Times, for Series Love and Laughter
 1996, National Readers' Choice Award, for The Perfect Father

Bibliography

Stand alone novels
Destinations South (1989)
Donovan's Chance (1990)
Moriah's Mutiny (1991)
An Unsuitable Man for the Job (1992)
Jake's Christmas (1992)
Hired Hand (1993)
The Wedding (1993)
Return Engagement (1993)
The Honeymoon (1995)
My Man Pendleton (1998)
Her Man Friday (1999)
How to Trap a Tycoon (2000)
That Boss of Mine (2000)
He Could Be the One (2001)
Take Me I'm Yours (2002)
The Ring on Her Finger (2003)
The Thing about Men (2004)
Undercover with the Mob (2004)
Indecent Suggestion (2005)
My Only Vice (2006)
Married to His Business (2007)
The House on Butterfly Way (2012)

Close Series
Close Range (1990)
Up Close (1992)

From Here To Maternity Series
A Dad Like Daniel (1995)
The Perfect Father (1995)
Dr. Daddy (1995)
A Doctor in Her Stocking (1999)
Dr. Irresistible (2000)
Dr. Mummy (2000)

From Here To Paternity Series
Father of the Brat (1996)
Father of the Brood (1996)
Father on the Brink (1996)

McCormick Series
Roxy and the Rich Man (1997)
Lucy and the Loner (1997)
Georgia Meets Her Groom (1997)

Blame It on Bob Series
Beauty and the Brain (1998)
Bride of the Bad Boy (1998)
The Virgin and the Vagabond (1998)

Follow that Baby Series Multi-Author
The Sheriff and the Impostor Bride (1998)

Fortune's Children Series Multi-Author
Society Bride (1999)

Monahan Series
First Comes Love (2000)
Monahan's Gamble (2000)
The Secret Life of Connor Monahan (2001)
The Temptation of Rory Monahan (2001)

Amber Court Series Multi-Author
When Jayne Met Erik (2001)

Crown and Glory Series Multi-Author
Taming the Prince (2002)

Dynasties the Barones Series Multi-Author
Taming the Beastly MD (2003)

Logan's Legacy Series Multi-Author
The Newlyweds (2005)

Fortunes of Texas: Reunion Series Multi-Author
The Debutante (2005)

The OPUS Spy Series
Just Like A Man (2005)
You've Got Male (2005)
Express Male (2006)
Overnight Male (2008)

Millionaire of the Month Series Multi-Author
Married To His Business (2007)

Thoroughbred Legacy Series Multi-Author
Flirting with Trouble (2008)

Kentucky Derby Series
Fast & Loose (2008)
Ready & Willing (2008)
Neck & Neck (2009)

Billionaire Series
The Billionaire Gets His Way (2011)
Caught in the Billionaire's Embrace (2011)
My Fair Billionaire (2014)

Collections
One in a Million / Undercover with the Mob (2005)

Omnibus In Collaboration
A Sprinkle of Fairy Dust (1996) (with Elaine Crawford, Marylyle Rogers and Maggie Shayne)
A Family Christmas (1997) (with Joan Hohl and Marilyn Pappano)
Love by Chocolate (1997) (with Rosanne Bittner, Muriel Jensen and Elda Minger)
Christmas Spirits (1997) (with Casey Claybourne, Lynn Kurland and Jenny Lykins)
A Message from Cupid (1998) (with Victoria Barrett, Margaret Brownley and Emily Carmichael)
Do You Take This Man? (1999) (with Annette Broadrick and Diana Palmer)
Opposites Attract (2000) (with Emily Carmichael, Lynn Kurland and Elda Minger)
Silhouette Sensational (2000) (with Cheryl Reavis, Sharon Sala and Sandra Steffen)
Christmas Weddings (2001) (with Anne McAllister)
It's Raining Men! (2001) (with Barbara McCauley)
A Mother's Day (2002) (with Marie Ferrarella and Emilie Richards)
Under Suspicion (2002) (with Bronwyn Jameson)
When Jayne Met Erik / Some Kind of Incredible (2002) (with Katherine Garbera)
All I Want for Christmas (2003) (with Kathleen Creighton)
Taming the Prince / Royally Pregnant (2003) (with Barbara McCauley)
Mother's Love (2004) (with Marie Ferrarella and Emilie Richards)
Sleeping with Her Rival / Taming the Beastly MD (2004) (with Sheri Whitefeather)
Motherhood (2005) (with Candace Camp and Diana Palmer)
Secret Heir / Newlyweds (2005) (with Gina Wilkins)
The Newlyweds / Right By Her Side (2005) (with Christie Ridgway)
Write It Up (2006) (with Tracy Kelleher and Mary Leo)
In the Boss's Arms (2006) (with Susan Mallery)
The Mills and Boon Summer Collection (2006) (with Dianne Drake and Cindi Myers)
Double the Heat (2007) (with Lori Foster, Deirdre Martin and Christie Ridgway)

References and sources

External links
Elizabeth Bevarly's Official Website
Elizabeth Bevarly in Harlequin Enterprises Ltd

1961 births
Living people
Writers from Louisville, Kentucky
American romantic fiction writers
American women writers
Women romantic fiction writers
Kentucky women writers
21st-century American women